Cayratia geniculata is a species of plant native to Asia. It has woody vines and 3-foliolate leaves.

References

 
 

geniculata